Stadio Vincenzo Presti is a multi-use stadium in Gela, Italy.  It is currently used mostly for football matches and is the home ground of Gela Calcio.  The stadium holds 4,400.

Vincenzo Presti
Gela
Sports venues in Sicily
Football in Sicily